Exit tax may refer to:
 Expatriation tax or emigration tax, a tax on persons who cease to be tax resident in a country
 Departure tax, a fee charged (under various names) by a country when a person is leaving the country
 Corporate exit tax, a tax on corporations who leave the country or transfer assets to another country